Hemicrepidius carbonatus is a species of click beetle belonging to the family Elateridae.

References

Beetles described in 1860
carbonatus